Gábor Vaspöri (born 26 October 1983 in Szombathely, Hungary) is a Hungarian weightlifter. His best results was 10th place at the 2014 European Weightlifting Championships in Tel Aviv.

Major results

References

External links
 

1983 births
Living people
Hungarian male weightlifters
Sportspeople from Szombathely